Elections to the Mizoram Legislative Assembly were held in April 1984 to elect members of the 30 constituencies in Mizoram, India. The Indian National Congress emerged as the single largest party and Lal Thanhawla was appointed as the Chief Minister of Mizoram.

Result

Elected Members

Nominated members
There were also 3 nominated members: Pi Rokungi, Pu F. Lalchhawna and Pu Zoduha, all of the Indian National Congress.

See also 
 List of constituencies of the Mizoram Legislative Assembly

References

Mizoram
1984
1984